This is a list of football clubs in the Cook Islands.

Clubs 2011 
Puaikura F.C.
Avatiu FC
Matavera FC
Nikao Sokattack FC
PTC Coconuts
Takuvaine FC
Teau-o-Tonga
Titikaveka FC
Tupapa Maraerenga FC

Cook Islands
 

Football clubs
Football